Shib (also Romanized as Shīb; also known as Deh Shīb and Deh Sab) is a village in Darbqazi Rural District, in the Central District of Nishapur County, Razavi Khorasan Province, Iran. At the 2006 census, its population was 139, in 41 families.

References 

Populated places in Nishapur County